La La Land is the second full-length album by Canadian indie rock band Plants and Animals, released April 20, 2010 on Secret City Records.

The album was a longlisted nominee for the 2010 Polaris Music Prize.

Track listing
 "Tom Cruz" –  4:53
 "Swinging Bells" –  2:27
 "American Idol" –  3:02
 "Undone Melody" –  6:05
 "Kon Tiki" –  3:23
 "Game Shows" –  5:11
 "The Mama Papa" –  4:19
 "Fake It" –  4:20
 "Celebration" –  4:57
 "Future from the 80s" –  4:16
 "Jeans Jeans Jeans" –  3:44

References

2010 albums
Plants and Animals albums
Secret City Records albums